German submarine U-624 was a Type VIIC U-boat built for Nazi Germany's Kriegsmarine for service during World War II.
She was laid down on 15 July 1941 by Blohm & Voss in Hamburg as yard number 600, launched on 31 March 1942 and commissioned on 28 May 1942 under Kapitänleutnant Ulrich Graf von Soden-Fraunhofen.

Design
German Type VIIC submarines were preceded by the shorter Type VIIB submarines. U-624 had a displacement of  when at the surface and  while submerged. She had two shafts and two  propellers.

U-624 was fitted with five  torpedo tubes (four fitted at the bow and one at the stern), fourteen torpedoes, one  SK C/35 naval gun, 220 rounds, and a  C/30 anti-aircraft gun. The boat had a complement of between forty-four and sixty.

Service history
The boat's service began on 28 May 1942 with training as part of the 8th U-boat Flotilla. She was transferred to the 7th Flotilla, operating out of St.Nazaire, on 1 October 1942 for active service in the North Atlantic .

Fate
U-624 was sunk on 7 February 1943 in the North Atlantic in position . She was caught unawares on the surface whilst transmitting to base a lengthy report of the previous night's action around Convoy SC 118. A RAF B-17 Flying Fortress aircraft of (Sqdn. 220/J), operating out of Londonderry Port, depth charged her  astern of the convoy. All 45 hands were lost.

Wolfpacks
U-624 took part in five wolfpacks, namely:
 Puma (23 – 29 October 1942) 
 Natter (30 October – 8 November 1942) 
 Kreuzotter (8 – 24 November 1942) 
 Habicht (10 – 19 January 1943) 
 Haudegen (19 January – 7 February 1943)

Summary of raiding history

References

Notes

Citations

Bibliography

External links

Ships lost with all hands
German Type VIIC submarines
1942 ships
U-boats commissioned in 1942
U-boats sunk by depth charges
U-boats sunk by British aircraft
U-boats sunk in 1943
World War II submarines of Germany
World War II shipwrecks in the Atlantic Ocean
Ships built in Hamburg
Maritime incidents in February 1943